Yew Tian Hoe is a Malaysian politician from DAP. He was the Member of Perak State Legislative Assembly for Aulong from 2008 to 2013.

Politics 
He was dropped as a candidate for the 2013 Malaysian general election in spite of being told by-then DAP Perak state chairman, Ngeh Koo Ham that he is going to defend his seat. However, he still participate in the election as an independent candidate.

Election result

References 

Democratic Action Party (Malaysia) politicians
Members of the Perak State Legislative Assembly
Malaysian people of Chinese descent
Malaysian politicians of Chinese descent
Living people
Year of birth missing (living people)